Frank Herbert Rose (5 July 1857 – 10 July 1928) was a British politician and journalist.

Born in Lambeth, Rose was educated at the George Street British School.  He became an engineer, and worked in the trade until 1899, when he became a journalist.  He was an early member of the Labour Party, and wrote The Coming Force, a history of the party.

At the 1906 UK general election, Rose stood unsuccessfully in Stockton, and then at the January 1910 UK general election he was unsuccessful in Crewe.  He was finally elected in Aberdeen North at the 1918 UK general election, and held the seat until his death, in 1928.  He was known for frequently defying the Labour whip, and so was sometimes considered to be an independent labour MP, despite his membership of the party.

External links 

Members of the Parliament of the United Kingdom for Aberdeen constituencies
1857 births
1928 deaths
Amalgamated Engineering Union-sponsored MPs
UK MPs 1918–1922
UK MPs 1922–1923
UK MPs 1923–1924
UK MPs 1924–1929
Scottish Labour MPs
People from Lambeth